Croatian citizen may refer to:

 Croatian citizenship
 Croatians (demonym)